Spatalistis viridphantasma is a species of moth of the family Tortricidae. It is found in northern Thailand.

The wingspan is 13–15 mm. The forewings are whitish, preserved as some spots, cream along the costa and greenish otherwise. The wings are faintly tinged with grey in the dorso-posterior area and there are sparse brown-black dots in the basal and terminal parts. There are also refractive silver spot. The hindwings are grey whiter basally and with a yellowish cream apex.

Etymology
The species name refers to the coloration of the species and is derived from Latin viridis (meaning green) and Greek phantasma (meaning phenomenon).

References

Moths described in 2012
viridphantasma
Moths of Asia
Taxa named by Józef Razowski